Kim Heung-soo (born 4 October 1980) is a South Korean ski jumper. He competed in the normal hill and large hill events at the 1998 Winter Olympics.

References

1980 births
Living people
South Korean male ski jumpers
Olympic ski jumpers of South Korea
Ski jumpers at the 1998 Winter Olympics
Place of birth missing (living people)